Bulbophyllum gymnopus is a species of orchid in the genus Bulbophyllum.

The plant produces the phenanthrenediol gymnopusin.

References

External links 
 The Bulbophyllum-Checklist
 The Internet Orchid Species Photo Encyclopedia

gymnopus
Taxa named by Joseph Dalton Hooker